Walter Frederick Morrison (January 23, 1920 – February 9, 2010) was an American inventor and entrepreneur, who invented the Frisbee.

Early life
Walter Fredrick "Fred" Morrison was born on January 23, 1920, in Richfield, Utah, the son of Dr. Walter F. Morrison, an optometrist.

Career
Morrison stated that the original idea for a flying disc toy came to him in 1937, while throwing a popcorn can lid with his girlfriend, Lucile Eleanor "Lu" Nay (1920–1987), whom he later married on April 3, 1939, in Los Angeles, California. The popcorn can lid soon dented which led to the discovery that cake pans flew better and were more common. A year later, Morrison and Lu were offered 25 cents for a cake pan that they were tossing back and forth on a Santa Monica, California, beach. Morrison detailed, in a 2007 interview, "That got the wheels turning, because you could buy a cake pan for five cents, and if people on the beach were willing to pay a quarter for it, well—there was a business." Morrison and Lu developed a little business selling "Flyin' Cake Pans" on the beaches of Los Angeles. 

During World War II Morrison learned something of aerodynamics flying his P-47 Thunderbolt in Italy. He was shot down and was a prisoner of war for 48 days. 

In 1946, Morrison sketched out a design (called the Whirlo-Way) for the world's first flying disc. In 1948 an investor, Warren Franscioni, paid for molding the design in plastic.  They named it the Flyin-Saucer. After disappointing sales, Fred and Warren parted ways in early 1950. In 1954, Fred bought more of the Saucers from the original molders to sell at local fairs, but soon found he could produce his own disc more cheaply. In 1955, he and Lu designed the Pluto Platter, the archetype of all modern flying discs. On January 23, 1957, they sold the rights for the Pluto Platter to the Wham-O toy company. Initially Wham-O continued to market the toy solely as the "Pluto Platter", but by June 1957 they also began using the name Frisbee after learning that college students in the Northeast were calling the Pluto Platter by that name. Morrison also invented several other products for Wham-O, but none were as successful as the Pluto Platter.

Personal life
Morrison and his wife, Lucile Nay Morrison, had a son and two daughters. After divorcing in March 1969 they remarried on April 3, 1971, then soon divorced again. Lucile died in 1987. Morrison died at the age of 90 on February 9, 2010. at his home in Monroe, Utah.

Published works
Kennedy, Phil (2006). Flat Flip Flies Straight, True Origins of the Frisbee, Wormhole Publishers

References

External links
 "Fred Morrison". The Telegraph. February 12, 2010.

1920 births
2010 deaths
20th-century American inventors
Flying disc
American prisoners of war in World War II
People from Richfield, Utah
American businesspeople
People from Monroe, Utah
United States Army Air Forces pilots of World War II
American World War II fighter pilots
Shot-down aviators
World War II prisoners of war held by Germany